Brian Chambers may refer to:

Barlow and Chambers execution (died 1986), refers to the hanging in 1986 by Malaysia of two Australian citizens, Charles John Barlow and Brian Geoffrey Chambers, for drug trafficking
Brian Chambers (Game Developer) (born 1972), American born Video Game Developer
Brian Chambers (cricketer) (born 1965), Australian born English cricketer
Brian Chambers (footballer) (born 1949), English footballer
Brian Chambers (curator) American curator